Eugene Victor Thaw (October 27, 1927 – January 3, 2018) was an American art dealer and collector. He was the owner of an art gallery on Madison Avenue in Manhattan, and a past president of the Art Dealers Association of America. With his wife, Clare, he donated over 1,000 works of art to the Fenimore Art Museum and the Morgan Library & Museum.

Early life
Thaw was born on October 27, 1927, in Washington Heights, Manhattan, New York City. His father was a heating contractor and his mother a schoolteacher. Thaw was educated at the DeWitt Clinton High School in Brooklyn and St. John's College in Annapolis.

Career
Thaw opened an art gallery and bookstore on West 44th Street at the Algonquin Hotel in 1950. He moved the gallery to Madison Avenue in 1954, He sold artwork to private collectors like Paul Mellon and Norton Simon as well as institutions like the Art Institute of Chicago, the Cleveland Museum of Art, the National Gallery of Art.

Thaw was a co-founder of the Art Dealers Association of America in 1962, and he served as its president from 1970 to 1972. He was an honorary trustee of the Metropolitan Museum of Art.

Thaw was also an art collector. Thaw's collection included drawings from modern and old masters, American Indian art, ancient Eurasian bronzes, early medieval jewelry, Native American art, architectural models, and eighteenth- and nineteenth-century oil sketches, French faience, in addition to paintings, sculpture, and furniture. He was the owner of drawings and paintings by Paul Cézanne, Joseph Cornell, Salvador Dalí, Honoré Daumier, Edgar Degas, Eugène Delacroix, Jean-Honoré Fragonard, Alberto Giacometti, Vincent van Gogh, Francisco Goya, Lee Krasner, Georgia O'Keeffe, Pablo Picasso, and Jackson Pollock, Odilon Redon, Rembrandt, as well as Native American art. With his wife, he donated 870 works of American Indian art to the Fenimore Art Museum. They also donated more than 400 works to the Morgan Library & Museum.

In 1985 and 1986 a group of small format paintings from the Thaw collection was exhibited at The Pierpont Morgan Library and the Virginia Museum of Fine Arts alongside drawings, bronzes, objets de vertu and faience, to present an idea of their additional interests as collectors.

In 2008, The Cooper Hewitt National Design Museum held an exhibition titled "House Proud", that commemorated a substantial gift made by Eugene and Clare Thaw of eighty five nineteenth-century exquisitely detailed watercolors of domestic interiors, the largest collection of this subject matter in America. The selection was ultimately shown in Paris at [[Musée de la Vie romantique]] in 2012-2013.

The Pierpont Morgan Library published a collection of his articles as Reflections of an Independent Mind in 1997. The book predominantly contains book reviews from 1980 to 1995 (including a very negative review of Suzi Gablik's Has Modernism Failed?), but also articles on collecting (1977-1995), museums and auction houses (1977-1990), and essays on Vincent Van Gogh (1980, 1984), Paul Cézanne (1984), Edgar Degas (1985), John Cheever (1982), Ralph F. Colin (1985), Pierre Matisse (1989), János Scholz (1993, 1995), John Rewald (1994), and Lore Heinemann (1997). These articles originally appeared in periodicals such as The New Republic, The New York Review of Books, The New York Times Book Review, The Times, The Spectator, The New Criterion, Heritage, ARTnews, and The American Scholar, as well as book editions of art works in his collection.

Personal life and death
Thaw married Clare Eddy in 1954. They resided in Cherry Valley, New York and Park Avenue, as well as in Santa Fe, New Mexico from 1987 to 2013. They had a son, Nicholas. Thaw was predeceased by his wife in June 2017.

Thaw died on January 3, 2018, in Cherry Valley, at age 90. Two hundred of his works were auctioned by Christie's on October 30, 2018.

Nazi-era restitution claims 
In 2021 the estate of Eugene Thaw reached a settlement agreement with the heirs of Margarete Eisenmann concerning the painting by Lucas Cranach the Elder, The Resurrection. Eisenmann was deported to Theriesenstandt in September 1942 and killed at the Treblinka concentration camp. Her estate was seized by Nazis and auctioned off. In 1949, the looted Cranach painting resurfaced in a Sotheby's sale in London, where it had been consigned by dealer Hans W. Lange, whose auction house was known for forced sales of Jewish-owned property.  Thaw bought it around 1968 after the Cranach had passed through the hands of New York dealers Hugo Perls and the Knoedler gallery.

References

1927 births
2018 deaths
People from Washington Heights, Manhattan
People from Cherry Valley, New York
People from Santa Fe, New Mexico
DeWitt Clinton High School alumni
St. John's College (Annapolis/Santa Fe) alumni
American art dealers
American art collectors